São Tomé de Meliapore was a province of Portuguese India which existed from 1523 to 1749. Administered by a Captain-Major, it covered most of Mylapore, a present-day Chennai neighbourhood.

References 
 

Former Portuguese colonies
1523 establishments in the Portuguese Empire